Dalian Futures Square 1 is a 53-floor 243 meter (797 foot) tall skyscraper currently under construction in Dalian, China.

See also
 List of tallest buildings in the world

External links

Skyscrapers in Dalian
Buildings and structures under construction in China
Skyscraper office buildings in China